The 1954 season was the forty-third season for Santos FC.

References

External links
Official Site 

Santos
1954
1954 in Brazilian football